Vecihi K-VI (full name: Vecihi K-VI Training and Reconnaissance Aircraft) was a Turkish training and reconnaissance aircraft, and the first aircraft built by the nation. Designed by aviator Vecihi Hürkuş in 1923 after a lack of planes in the Turkish Air Force during the Turkish War of Independence, the plane was completed with the help of his friends only in late 1924. Despite not receiving a flight permit due to lack of qualified personnel in the committee that was supposed to certify the plane, Hürkuş flew the K-VI for the first time in January 1925, for which he received a jail sentence. He was later pardoned but left the air force following the decision. He made unsuccessful attempts to get the plane back and the Vecihi K-VI was eventually destroyed under unknown circumstances.

Development and production 

During the 1919–1923 Turkish War of Independence, the Turkish Air Force lacked aircraft. Vecihi Hürkuş, an aviator participating in the war, wanted the country to have its own aircraft. In a 1925 interview with Resimli Ay, Hürkuş said that he was hesitant about building a plane at first, but that he was convinced by his friends. He worked to make a design that was simple and had similar specifications to airplanes already in use. On 14 June 1923, Hürkuş finished the technical drawings of the plane, which was to be used for training and reconnaissance purposes, and showed the project to lieutenant general Muzaffer Ergüder, an inspector in the air force, three days later, on 17 June. After inspecting, Ergüder congratulated Hürkuş, and suggested that the plane should be called "Vecihi".

After the plane was approved by the air force, Hürkuş and four of his friends started to build the plane at the Halkapınar Aircraft Repair Workshop. Work started on 24 June. Having a limited budget, the engine of Vecihi K-VI was taken from a captured plane of the Hellenic Air Force. For the rest of the plane, Hürkuş used wood, steel rods, and fabric sourced from Turkey. Aircraft dope was used to strengthen the fabric. Hürkuş spent at least 16 hours a day on the plane, sometimes sleeping less than two hours to finish the project. He was briefly sent away for a few months to study European aviation. By the time he returned, the wooden frame was finished, and only had to be covered with fabric. The Vecihi K-VI was constructed in a total of 14 months, and was completed by late 1924.

Operational history

Maiden flight 
After the plane was finished, it was moved to the Seydiköy Airfield, where engine and taxiing tests took place. Hürkuş asked for a flying permit, and a technical committee was formed to certify the plane. However, this committee lacked qualified personnel to fly the plane. Hürkuş and his plane waited almost a month. One of the members told Hürkuş that they could not give him the license, and said that he "should hop in and fly if he trusts [his] plane." On 28 January 1925, Hürkuş arrived at the airfield, which was completely empty. At 15:00 local time, Hürkuş took off after a short roll and made a 15-minute flight with Vecihi K-VI. This was the first flight ever to use a Turkish-built plane. By the time he came back, the airfield was filled with a crowd, who were cheering for him. After landing, Hürkuş was greeted by his celebrating friends.

Subsequent history 
Hürkuş was talking to his friends about the flight after the plane was towed to the hangar, when he was notified that he had received a short jail sentence, as he had neglected the orders of the inspectorship by flying without a permit. While the decision was overturned later, he left the air force and the plane stayed unused. The plane was stored out in the open where it was subject to corrosion in İzmir. Hürkuş tried to get the K-VI back, but he was only "met with lingering". His requests to store the plane in an indoor area were also declined. The Turkish Aeronautical Association officially requested to use the plane for flights aimed to gather donations for the association, but the plane was never given to them. The Vecihi K-VI was later destroyed under unknown circumstances.

In 1930, Hürkuş built a second aircraft named the Vecihi K-XIV, which he flew for the first time on 16 September 1930. The K-XIV was sent to Prague, Czechoslovakia by train in February 1931 to get certified. The process was completed on 23 April and the certified plane was flown back to Turkey on 5 May.

Specifications

Notes

References

Citations

Bibliography

External links 

Aircraft first flown in 1925
Single-engined tractor aircraft
1920s Turkish military trainer aircraft
Biplanes